Michael Talbert Kopech (born April 30, 1996) is an American professional baseball pitcher for the Chicago White Sox of Major League Baseball (MLB). He made his MLB debut in 2018. Kopech bats and throws right-handed.

Amateur career
Kopech attended Mount Pleasant High School in Mount Pleasant, Texas. While in high school, he developed a baseball rivalry and eventual friendship with Patrick Mahomes He committed to attend the University of Arizona. Kopech posted a 3–0 win–loss record and a 0.44 earned run average (ERA) in 11 games for Mount Pleasant, striking out 129 batters and giving up just 18 walks in 64 innings pitched, while earning 2014 Perfect Game First-Team All-American honors.

Professional career

Boston Red Sox
Kopech was selected by the Boston Red Sox in the first round, with the 33rd overall selection, of the 2014 Major League Baseball draft. He received a $1.6 million signing bonus from Boston. Kopech started his professional career with the rookie-level Gulf Coast League Red Sox in their 2014 season. He posted a 0–1 record and a 4.61 ERA in eight starts, which included 16 strikeouts and nine walks in  innings pitched.

In 2015, Kopech pitched for the Greenville Drive of the Class A South Atlantic League (SAL), where he was 4–5 with a 2.63 ERA in 15 games. He struck out 70 batters and walked 27, in 65 innings, while earning a selection to the SAL All-Star Game. On July 16, he was suspended without pay for 50 games after testing positive for Oxilofrine, which is a banned substance under the Minor League Drug Prevention and Treatment Program. In the 2016 spring training, Kopech broke his right hand during an altercation involving a roommate. He returned to action in the season-opener for the Lowell Spinners of the Class A-Short Season New York-Penn League, and was promoted to the Salem Red Sox of the Class A-Advanced Carolina League. In his first five starts at Salem, Kopech yielded only three earned runs in 29 innings with at least seven strikeouts in every game. In total, Kopech made 11 starts, going 4–1 with a 2.25 ERA across 52 innings. During that stretch, he struck out 82 hitters, the most for a pitcher in MiLB for the month of August. He posted a 2.08 ERA and gave only 29 walks, striking out double-digit batters in four of his last six starts, including a career-high 11 twice. After his solid pitching effort, Kopech was named  the Carolina League Player of the Month for August. The award came along with his selection as the league's Pitcher of the Week for August 22–28. He carried a 0.93 ERA into his final start of the season before a tough outing against the Winston-Salem Dash on August 31. Overall, he collected 86 strikeouts in  innings during the two stints (13.7 SO/9, 38% of batters faced), along with a 4–1 record and a 2.08 ERA.

According to Baseball America, Kopech threw one of the fastest pitches in professional baseball history against the Wilmington Blue Rocks on July 13, 2016.

Chicago White Sox
On December 6, 2016, the Red Sox traded Kopech, Yoan Moncada, Luis Alexander Basabe, and Victor Diaz to the Chicago White Sox for Chris Sale. In 2017, Kopech was named the starter for the North Division in the Southern League All-Star Game after he went 4–3 with a 2.93 ERA over  innings and a league best 80 strikeouts in his first 11 starts for the Double-A Birmingham Barons. He was later named to the U.S. team of the 2017 All-Star Futures Game, striking out White Sox teammate Yoan Moncada of the World team. On August 18, 2017, the White Sox promoted Kopech to the Triple-A Charlotte Knights after he posted a 2.87 ERA over  innings in 22 starts with 155 strikeouts. Over his final five starts in Birmingham, Kopech allowed two earned runs and accumulated 49 strikeouts.

The White Sox promoted Kopech to the major leagues on August 21, and he made his debut that day. His outing lasted only two innings because of rain. He struck out four batters and did not allow any runs. On his second pitch of the game he gave up his first hit, a single, to Joe Mauer.  At the time of his debut, he was considered the 13th best prospect in all of MLB. Kopech underwent Tommy John surgery on September 18, putting him out for the rest of the 2018 season plus all of 2019 as well. On July 10, 2020, Kopech announced he would be sitting out the 2020 season due to the COVID-19 pandemic.

Kopech began the 2021 season as a member of the White Sox' pitching staff. On April 2, Kopech made his 2021 debut against the Los Angeles Angels coming out of the bullpen going two innings striking out three and walking one and got the win. He made his first start in Game 2 of a doubleheader against the Boston Red Sox going three innings, only giving up one run and striking out four batters. On May 26, Kopech threw a pitch and then slipped and fell off the mound and was limping into the dugout. He was placed on the 10-day IL with a strained left hamstring on May 31. Kopech was activated off the IL on June 30. Overall in 2021, Kopech appeared in 44 games while starting in four of them with a record of 4–3 with an ERA of 3.50 in  innings while striking out 103 batters. In game 3 of the 2021 ALDS against the Houston Astros, Kopech picked up his first career postseason win coming in the second inning for relief of White Sox starter Dylan Cease. Kopech went  innings giving up four hits, three runs (including a home run), one walk, and struck out five batters leading the White Sox to a 12–6 victory.

In 2022, Kopech made his way to the starting role. During the season, Kopech was on and off the injured list. In a game against the Kansas City Royals, Kopech felt soreness in his left knee before the first pitch but tried to pitch anyway. He ended up leaving the game after facing four batters in the first inning and was placed on the IL with a left knee strain. Kopech made two more starts before he was placed on the IL again on September 17 with right shoulder inflammation and was shut down for the season.

Overall in 2022, Kopech made 25 starts posting a 5–9 record with a 3.54 ERA in  innings with 105 strikeouts and 57 walks. He led the major leagues in highest walk percentage, at 11.5%.

On January 13, 2023, Kopech agreed to a one-year, $2.05 million contract with the White Sox, avoiding salary arbitration.

Personal life
In 2019, Kopech announced his engagement to Canadian actress Vanessa Morgan. Kopech and Morgan married in January 2020, but Kopech filed for divorce shortly thereafter in June 2020. Morgan gave birth to their son in January 2021. In May 2022, Kopech was placed on paternity leave to be present for the birth of his second child with his new girlfriend

References

External links
, or MiLB.com

1996 births
Living people
People from Mount Pleasant, Texas
Baseball players from Texas
Major League Baseball pitchers
Chicago White Sox players
Gulf Coast Red Sox players
Greenville Drive players
Lowell Spinners players
Salem Red Sox players
Surprise Saguaros players
Birmingham Barons players
Charlotte Knights players